Carboxy-lyases, also known as decarboxylases, are carbon–carbon lyases that add or remove a carboxyl group from organic compounds. These enzymes catalyze the decarboxylation of amino acids, beta-keto acids and alpha-keto acids.

Classification and nomenclature
Carboxy-lyases are categorized under EC number 4.1.1.
Usually, they are named after the substrate whose decarboxylation they catalyze, for example pyruvate decarboxylase catalyzes the decarboxylation of pyruvate.

Examples
 Aromatic-L-amino-acid decarboxylase
 Glutamate decarboxylase
 Histidine decarboxylase
 Ornithine decarboxylase
 Phosphoenolpyruvate carboxylase
 Pyruvate decarboxylase
 RuBisCO – the only carboxylase that leads to a net fixation of carbon dioxide
 Uridine monophosphate synthetase
 Uroporphyrinogen III decarboxylase
 enoyl-CoA carboxylases/reductases (ECRs)

See also
 Enzymes
 Lyases
 List of EC numbers of enzymes belonging to category EC 4.1

References

External links